"Wha'll be King but Charlie?" also known as The News from Moidart, is a song about Bonnie Prince Charlie, sung to the tune of 'Tidy Woman', a traditional Irish jig the date of which is unclear but the tune was well known by 1745. The lyrics were written by Caroline Nairne (1766 – 1845). Because Nairne published anonymously, the authorship of this and her other poems and lyrics was once unclear, however, late in her life Nairne identified herself and modern scholars accept that these lyrics are hers. Carolina, Baroness Nairne was a Jacobite from a Jacobite family living at a time when the last remnants of political Jacobitism were fading as Scotland entered a period of Romantic nationalism and literary romanticism. Bonnie Prince Charlie stayed in the house where Caroline Nairne was born and reared when fleeing British capture after losing the Battle of Culloden.

Wha'll be King but Charlie? was popular from the late 18th into the 20th century. The tune was borrowed for use as an African-American spiritual, with an allusion in the hymn to " King Jesus " suggest(ing) that the name of the tune was known to its adaptor.  In the 1840s bestseller Two Years Before the Mast, Richard Henry Dana, describes a gathering of sailors with the French singing "La Marseillaise", the Germans singing "O du lieber Augustin", British sailors singing "Rule, Britannia!" and the Scots, "Wha'll be King but Charlie?".

Notable usage of the song
In 1867 The San Jose Mercury campaigned for the election of Charles Maclay to the California State Senate with the song Wha'll be King but Charlie?

The song is one of the dance tunes played in the final scene of the 1921 film Sentimental Tommy as dancers fill the screen.

In his novel The starling: a Scotch story, Norman McLeod tells of a boy who taught his pet starling to whistle the tune of "Wha'll be King but Charlie?".

The Corries, a late 20th century Scottish singing group, performed the song in concert and recorded it.

Meaning
"Wha'll" is a Scots way of saying "who'll" (who will). The song references Bonnie Prince Charlie, Stuart pretender to the crown.  Prince Charlie traveled to Scotland to lead the Jacobite rising of 1745, which would prove to be the last Jacobite military attempt to capture the throne.  After losing the Battle of Culloden, Prince Charlie fled to the remote peninsula of Moidart, from which, with a handful of leading Jacobites, he fled to exile in France.

Lyrics

External links
 Video of the Corries singing "The News From Moidart"

References

Scottish folk songs
Scottish songs
Jacobite songs